The Oxford Revue is a comedy group primarily featuring students from Oxford University and Oxford Brookes University, England. Founded in the early 1950s, The Oxford Revue has produced many prominent comedians, actors and satirists. The Revue writes, produces and performs several shows each term in the pubs and theatres around Oxford, as well as touring to cities in the United Kingdom and performing a month-long run at the Edinburgh Fringe Festival every year.

History
According to a version of the Oxford Revue website circa 2003/2004, "the founding of the Revue in around 1952/3 is shrouded in mystery. The most accurate account of it to date is probably that of Michael Palin, former Revue Director, who describes how his brother-in-law and 'another mad gentleman' started the Oxford Theatre Group, as a source of funding for Edinburgh shows, in the early 1950s. From this, he "helped found an offshoot group, the Oxford Revue Group, to take a revue up to the Edinburgh Fringe".

Former members include:

Michael Palin and Terry Jones (who later became members of Monty Python)
Dudley Moore (later of Beyond the Fringe, Pete and Dud and Not Only... But Also)
Alan Bennett (later of Beyond the Fringe)
Rowan Atkinson
Maggie Smith
Al Murray
Richard Curtis
Katy Brand
Stewart Lee
Ken Loach
Angus Deayton
Richard Herring
Rebecca Front (first female president of the Revue)
Armando Iannucci
Philip Pope
Laura Solon
Katherine Parkinson
Peter Harness
Laura Corcoran and Matthew Floyd Jones
Sally Phillips
Guy Browning
Ben Moor
Waen Shepherd
Emma Kennedy
David Schneider
Geoffrey Perkins
Imogen Stubbs
Patrick Marber

Frank Cottrell-Boyce
Howard Goodall
Kieran Hodgson

Recent activities (2021 to present)
In August 2021, the Oxford Revue published their online Fringe show 'The Oxford Revue Kills God, Again', directed by Angus Moore and Jack McMinn and filmed in the Burton-Taylor Studio and University Parks - the 42 minute production was then published on their Facebook page in December 2021. On 15th January 2022, the Revue performed another sketch show, 'The People VS. The Oxford Revue', directed by Alison Hall and Alfred Dry, live at the Old Fire Station in Oxford - tickets completely sold out at least 2 days before the opening night and the show itself was critically acclaimed.

The Oxford Revue regularly updates its Facebook, Twitter and Instagram, the latter of which recently hosted a series of shorts called 'Insta-Revue!'. They also continue to regularly collaborate with other comedy groups across the UK (including the Durham Revue and the Cambridge Footlights. They brought two shows to Edinburgh Fringe 2022 - The People vs. The Oxford Revue and The Oxford Revue and other Farmyard Animals, both of which were directed by Alison Hall and Alfred Dry. The Oxford Revue performances were given 4 1/2 stars by the Edinburgh Fringe Derek Awards.

Celebrating its 70th anniversary in 2022/2023, the Revue began working closely with the Jericho Tavern, using it as the venue for the shows Best of the Fringe (directed by Leah Aspden and Jack McMinn), The Ox-mas Pantomime Spectacular (directed by Leah Aspden and Jack McMinn), The Oxford Revue presents 'Trial and Error'  (directed by Jake Mainwaring)  and The Oxford Revue presents 'Accidents at Work'  (directed by Tom Pavey and Absana Rutherford). Additionally, the Oxford Revue ran The Stand-up Showcase, a free stand-up evening at St Anne's College, Oxford, and is currently preparing for its 2023 Hilary term showcase, The Oxford Revue Strikes Back.

Mascot and logo
The current mascot of the Oxford Revue is a pig in a sailor's hat named Admiral Philip, drawn by Revue member Nick Davies in 2013. 
In 2021, Philip the Pig's design was updated to include a top hat and bow tie, as well as a New Zealand accent.
Philip was also the logo of the Revue for an extended period, before being replaced with the present 'Simpsons font' variant.

References

External links
 Oxford Revue website
 University of Oxford Drama
 

1952 establishments in England
Organizations established in 1952
Amateur theatre companies in England
Theatre in Oxford
Clubs and societies of the University of Oxford
Student theatre in the United Kingdom